Nikola Đorđević (also transliterated Nikola Djordjević; born 5 October 1999) is a Serbian football forward.

Career

Red Star Belgrade
Born in Belgrade, Đorđević passed the Red Star Belgrade school, and after youth categories he was loaned to Sopot for 2 seasons. Returning in the first team, he signed a new contract on 10 July 2013. After the club management failed to find him a club where he could be loaned, he was training out of the first team along with a few players under the contract. In the winter break off-season, he moved in Sloga Petrovac na Mlavi on 6 six-month loan. He made 12 appearances until the end of 2013–14 season and scored 1 goal against Bežanija. Beginning of 2014–15 season, he was loaned to BASK on 6 months. He was nominated for the man of the match in a match against GSP Polet. For the rest of season, young forward was fully transferred to the club.

Career statistics

References

External links
 
 
 

1993 births
Living people
Footballers from Belgrade
Serbian footballers
FK Sopot players
FK Sloga Petrovac na Mlavi players
FK BASK players
Serbian First League players
Association football forwards